Records of the Border Defense Council of Joseon or Bibyeonsa Deungnok(in Hangul:비변사등록) is the records of the Border Defense Council during Joseon dynasty, consisting of 273 books. The council was in charge of legislating important state affairs, which, exactly to put, was actually temporary bureau in terms of national security in early 16th century, after Japanese invasion in 1592. As the scope and the invasion became wider and more often in the era of Jungjong, the establishment of the Council officially was guaranteed and later expanded to broader scope. The council later became the supremest organ to address overall state affairs.

Records
As the council concerned almost every single sector of affairs since mid-Joseon, the records share highly important value in terms of legislative processes, politics and history of Joseon.

Generally, the Border defense council published one annal each year, while depending on several incidents, the annals can be more than two. The starting date of publishment remains not sure, however. The most convincing period when the records might officially start is in 1555 - official establishment of the council. Under the assumption, the perfect remnants of the records should be 276 books until 1892. 54 years' records does not exist in the current time.

The title of each year's record is not always consistent, depending on incidents occurred in each year. Each annal firstly recorded the era of the King, the date and the member of the discussion in each month's council and then, the contents could be published. Therefore, the reader can find out what kinds of incidents happened and how the council legislated the aftermaths.

Additionally, the records include diverse description regarding society and economy of Joseon - the books of 250 in the formation of supplements to the book. These annals are highly appreciated information in terms of socio-economical stance and transition in the mid and late Joseon. The original publication belongs to Gyujanggak. In 1959–60, the Korean History Committee re-published the full annals into 28 pieces, while the finalized translation into Hangul was finished in 2010.

See also
 State Council of Joseon
 Joseon Dynasty
 History of Korea

Notes
 The council was abolished in 1865, the second year of Gojong of Joseon, coming back to the former supreme organ, State council. The writing continued to keep abreast of its work until 1892 as the council had nearly equal formation with State council with just a slight change of the title into Uijeongbu Deungnok - The records of State Council of Joseon. As the order and pattern of the annals were also in conformity, Uijeongbu Deungnok is also considered as Records of the Border Defense Council.
 The Records of the Border Defense Council widely affected the Annals of the Joseon Dynasty - the background readings and information as the reference.

References

 The Records of the Border Defense Council of Joseon, Bibyeonsa Deungnok Daum Culture Contents Encyclopedia
 Bibyeonsa - the Records of the Border Defense Council 
 The Academy of Korean Studies

History books about Korea
House of Yi
Joseon dynasty works
National Treasures of South Korea
History of Korea